Lasiothyris puertoricana is a species of moth of the family Tortricidae. It is found in Puerto Rico.

The wingspan is about 9 mm. The ground colour of the forewings is cream with indistinct pale ochreous suffusions. The markings are light ferruginous. The hindwings are cream white, slightly mixed with brownish on the periphery.

Etymology
The species name refers to the country of origin.

References

Moths described in 2007
Cochylini